Đàm Thanh Sơn (born 1969) is a Vietnamese theoretical physicist working in quantum chromodynamics, applications of string theory and many-body physics.

Early life and education
Born in North Vietnam, Bac Ninh. Sơn attended HUS High School for Gifted Students, where he won gold medal in the International Mathematics Olympiad with an absolute score, and received his Ph.D. at the Institute for Nuclear Research in Moscow in 1995.

Career
Sơn was a postdoc at the University of Washington from 1995 to 1997, and the MIT Center for Theoretical Physics from 1997 to 1999. From 1999 to 2002 he was a professor at Columbia University and a RIKEN-BNL fellow. He moved to Seattle in 2002 when he became a Senior Fellow at the Institute for Nuclear Theory and a professor in the Physics Department, University of Washington. Then in 2012, he moved to Chicago and became the 19th person to hold a University Professorship at University of Chicago.

Honors
 Outstanding Junior Investigator in Nuclear Physics, DOE, 2000
 Alfred P. Sloan Foundation Fellow, 2001
 American Physical Society Fellow, 2006
 Simons Investigator Award, 2013
 Elected to American Academy of Arts and Sciences, 2014
 Elected to National Academy of Sciences, 2014
 Dirac Medal of the ICTP, 2018 
 Bogolyubov Prize, 2019

References

External links
 Home page at the University of Chicago

1969 births
Theoretical physicists
String theorists
International Mathematical Olympiad participants
Vietnamese academics
Vietnamese scientists
Living people
Members of the United States National Academy of Sciences
University of Chicago faculty
Simons Investigator
MIT Center for Theoretical Physics alumni
People educated at High School for Gifted Students, Hanoi University of Science